Amos Glacier is a  long glacier that flows southeast from Bettle Peak to a juncture with the Blue Glacier (southeast of Hannon Hill), in Victoria Land, Antarctica. It was named in 1992 by the Advisory Committee on Antarctic Names after Larry Leon Amos, a civil engineer with the United States Geological Survey (USGS), and a member of the USGS two man astronomic surveying team to South Pole Station and Byrd Station in the 1969–70 field season. Among other work, the team established the position of the Geographic South Pole (previously done 1956) and established a tie to the Byrd Ice Strain net which had been under study for several years.

See also
 List of glaciers in the Antarctic
 Glaciology

References 

Glaciers of Scott Coast